Kleptolagnia (from Greek kleptein meaning "to steal", and lagnia meaning "sexual excitement") is the state of being sexually aroused by theft. A kleptolagniac is a person aroused by the act of theft. It is also known as kleptophilia, and is a sexual form of kleptomania.

See also
 Chremastistophilia

References

Sexual fetishism
Theft